Museum of Antiquities may refer to:

Museum of Antiquities at Newcastle University
Museum of Antiquities (Algiers)
Museum of Egyptian Antiquities
Museum of Antiquities of the University of Leipzig
Museum of Antiquities in Vilnius
Museum of Antiquities (Saskatoon)

See also
 National Museum of Antiquities (disambiguation)